Remo De Angelis (30 July 1926 - 9 October 2014) was an Italian film actor, stunt man and painter.

He appeared in Nel Segno di Roma (1959), by Guido Brignone, and he played Prometheus in Maciste all'inferno (1962), by Riccardo Freda. He was the stunt coordinator in Taste for Killing (1968) by Tonino Valerii, where also played the vice sheriff, and  he also played Mario Ansuini in My Dear Killer (1972). Others Spaghetti Western films including Clint the Nevada's Loner (1967), by Alfonso Balcázar, The Great Adventure (1975), by Gianfranco Baldanello, The Great Silence (1968), by Sergio Corbucci, Texas, Adios (1966), by Ferdinando Baldi, and The Unholy Four (1970), by Enzo Barboni.

He died in Rome on 9 October 2014.

Filmography

As actor

As assistant director

As production manager
 Noi duri (1960)

References

Bibliography

External links
 

1926 births
2014 deaths
Italian stunt performers
Italian male film actors
20th-century Italian painters
20th-century Italian male artists
21st-century Italian painters
Italian male painters
21st-century Italian male artists